Founded in 1975, Toshiba Telecommunication Systems Division (TSD) was a division of Toshiba America Information Systems Inc. (TAIS). This, in turn, is an independent operating company owned by Toshiba America Inc., a subsidiary of Toshiba Corporation.

Headquartered in Irvine, California, TSD is a manufacturer of IP business telephone systems, designed for small to medium-sized businesses and larger enterprises with multiple locations.  Its 'Strata CIX IP' business telephone systems and related applications are sold by a network of Authorized Toshiba Dealers throughout the United States and Latin America.

Products 

Some of Toshiba Telecommunications Systems Division's (TSD's) products include:

IPedge Pure IP Business Telephone System
VIPedge Cloud-based Business Telephone Solution
Strata CIX IP Business Telephone Systems
Unified Communications
Conferencing and Collaboration Solutions
Call Center Solutions
IP Business Telephones
Digital Business Telephones
Business Mobility Solutions
SIP Trunking
Voice Mail Systems

References 

Frost & Sullivan - Toshiba Executive Q&A: http://www.frost.com/prod/servlet/market-insight-top.pag?docid=210945608

Gartner 2010 Unified Communications Magic Quadrant: http://www.gartner.com/technology/media-products/reprints/microsoft/vol10/article19/article19.html

Gartner 2010 Corporate Telephony Magic Quadrant: http://www.gartner.com/technology/media-products/reprints/microsoft/vol14/article1/article1.html

Nemertes 2010 Pilothouse Award Winner: https://web.archive.org/web/20101002144731/http://nemertes.com/press_releases/nemertes_research_announces_2010_pilothouse_awards

Phone Plus - Columbia Southern University Case Study: http://www.phoneplusmag.com/articles/2010/07/case-study-toshiba.aspx

2010 IP Contact Center Pioneer Award From Customer Interaction Solutions Magazine: http://outbound-call-center.tmcnet.com/topics/outbound-call-center/articles/92301-2010-ip-contact-center-technology-pioneer-award-winners.htm

2009 Communications Solutions Product of the Year Award: http://communication-solutions.tmcnet.com/topics/communication-solutions/articles/89271-communications-solutions-2009-product-the-year-award-winners.htm

Letter from Brian Metherell regarding wind-down of TAIS TSD: https://t.e2ma.net/click/z8ngz/flgfcb/f1kh5g

External links 
 http://www.telecom.toshiba.com

Toshiba